"Blue Chair" is a song written by new wave musician Elvis Costello and recorded by Costello with his backing band the Attractions. The song first appeared on Costello's 1986 album, Blood & Chocolate. First intended for Costello's previous album King of America, the song was scrapped during that session and reworked with the Attractions around Steve Nieve's piano part.

After the song appeared as an album track on Blood and Chocolate, Costello reworked the earlier King of America track and released it as a solo single in 1987. The single reached number 94 in Britain. Since its release, the song has been lauded by critics.

Background
"Blue Chair" was first written by Costello for his 1986 album King of America. Costello attempted to record a version of the song with his longstanding backing band, the Attractions, but deemed this version "lacklustre" and scrapped it. Costello then attempted it with the Confederates, a collection of studio musicians with whom he recorded most of King of America. Per Costello, this version remained in the tentative running order for King of America for a long time, but was scrapped late into the album's assembly because "it seemed brash and too eager to please without really doing so." Costello commented in a 1986 interview:

During the sessions for Costello's next album, Blood & Chocolate, he revived the song. Having reunited with the Attractions for the album, Costello and the band rearranged the song around Steve Nieve's piano part. Costello noted that this "fully realized" new arrangement was inspired by Prince's songs "Manic Monday" and "Raspberry Beret."

Release
"Blue Chair" was first released on Blood & Chocolate in September 1986. Though this version was not released as a single, Costello returned again to the track after the two singles from Blood & Chocolate, "Tokyo Storm Warning" and "I Want You", underachieved commercially. Costello explained,

This new recording of "Blue Chair" was released as a single in January 1987. The single did not reverse Costello's commercial fortunes, only reaching number 94 on the UK charts. This version would appear on the rarities album Out of Our Idiot later that same year, as well as on later expanded editions of Blood & Chocolate.

Critical reception
"Blue Chair" has received critical acclaim since its release. Barry Gutman of the East Coast Rocker described the song as "poppy" in an 1986 article, noting that the song was reminiscent of Costello's 1979 album Armed Forces. Retrospectively, David Gorman of Trunkworthy praised the song as one he could "listen to a dozen times in a row," singling out the single rerecording as his preferred version, asserting that it features "the best singing the man has ever done." Diffuser.fm cited the song as an example of "pretty melodic stuff" on Blood & Chocolate, while Stereogum named it one of the "sneering gems" on the album.

Charts

References

Sources

Elvis Costello songs
1987 singles
1987 songs
Songs written by Elvis Costello
Song recordings produced by Nick Lowe
Song recordings produced by T Bone Burnett